Matt Everard (born 9 January 1991) is a rugby union coach and former professional player. He is currently an assistant coach at Leicester Tigers. He previously worked in a coaching role at Wasps RFC, after retiring from playing for Nottingham in 2017 where he was captain, and played in the back row. He was previously the director of rugby for Long Eaton RFC where he was assisted by former Nottingham teammates Murray McConnell and Tom Holmes.

On 15th Feb 2018 Matt announced his retirement from playing at the end of the 2017/18 season in order to concentrate on his coaching career.

Previous career
Previous to joining Wasps, Everard had a lengthy career with spells at Nottingham, Leicester Tigers and Wasps where he was signed after impressing at England under 20 level.

Education
Everard attended Loughborough Grammar School, where he still retains strong links, organising the annual "Robbie's Rugby Festival", hosted at the school in aid of The Robbie Anderson Cancer Trust and The Jake McCarthy Foundation

References

1991 births
Living people
Leicester Tigers players
Leicester Tigers coaches
Nottingham R.F.C. players
Wasps RFC players
Rugby union players from Leicester